S. cinnabarina may refer to:

 Salvia cinnabarina, a flowering plant
 Sophronitis cinnabarina, a small orchid
 Stilbella cinnabarina, a plant pathogen